Natela Dzalamidze and Veronika Kudermetova were the defending champions and they were able to successfully defend their title, defeating Ysaline Bonaventure and Naomi Broady in the final, 6–2, 6–0.

Seeds

Draw

References
Main Draw

President's Cup - Doubles